Dedicated is the thirteenth studio album by Australian soul and R&B singer Renée Geyer.  The album is predominantly a covers album, with two new tracks written by Paul Kelly. The album was released in September 2007 and peaked at number 53 on the ARIA Charts.

Geyer toured the album throughout Australia from October to December 2007.

Reception 
Bernard Zuel from Sydney Morning Herald said; "Dedicated is perfectly capable of standing on its own terms as an album of diverse origins, very fine playing and production and a voice in boisterous and sometimes quite wicked form." Zuel praised the two new Kelly tracking saying they "...find Geyer digging deep and extracting heart-crushing richness" and "Why Can't We Live Together" which Zuel said "is one long smouldering fire" while "Distant Lover" "has all the smoothness of the best early '70s smoky soul".

Megan Smith from Out in Perth said; "Renée Geyer has a lot of soul, there is no doubt about that, whether breathing life into classic R&B tracks or giving voice for the first time to the latest thing penned by Paul Kelly, Renee is flawless in her ability to give voice to every last bit of passionate emotion a song is capable of. On some tracks the emotions evoked are drastically different from the original. Such is the case on the first single "I Wish It Would Rain", originally by The Temptations, where she opts for brass over the strings of the original and creates a jamming, playful tune. On other tracks, such as Marvin Gaye’s "Distant Lover" she pays homage to the song’s creator, taking her voice from impassioned pleading to smooth as fine whiskey."

On 24 September 2007, Dedicated was Radio National's Tim Ritchie's album of the week with Ritchie saying "She's a woman who can find that special thing in a song and make it her own."

Track listing 
 "Why Can't We Live Together" (Timmy Thomas) – 4:41
 "I Wish It Would Rain" (Norman Whitfield, Barrett Strong, Roger Penzabene) – 4:13
 "Please Leave Your Light On" (Paul Kelly) – 3:51
 "Somebody's On Your Case" (Earl Randle) – 4:10
 "Dedicated to the One I Love" (Lowman Pauling, Ralph Bass) – 4:02
 "When a Woman Loves a Man" (Kelly) – 4:36
 "Steal Away" (Jimmy Highes) – 3:38
 "A Beautiful Morning" (Eddie Brigati, Felix Cavaliere) – 3:11
 "So I Can Love You" (Sheila Hutchinson) – 3:52
 "Distant Lover" (Gwen Gordy Fuqua, Marvin Gaye, Sandra Greene) – 4:01
 "It's a Man's Man's Man's World" (James Brown, Betty Newsome) – 6:39

Personnel 
 Brad Pinto, Danny Williams, Gary Pinto, Janine Maunder, Jude Nicholas, Kylie Auldist, Rebecca Barnard, Tania Doco – backing vocals
 Yuri Pavlinov – bass
 Daniel Farrugia – drums
 Lydia Davies, Sam Keevers – piano
 Jeff Burstin, Mark Punch, Ross Hanford,- guitar
 Greg Spence, Jordan Murray,  Paul Williamson – horns
 Bruce Haymes – keyboard, organ, synthesiser
 Chong Nee – vocoder

Charts

Release history

References 

2007 albums
Renée Geyer albums
Capitol Records albums
Blues albums by Australian artists
Jazz albums by Australian artists